The 2009 Albirex Niigata season is Albirex Niigata's sixth consecutive season in J. League Division 1. It also includes the 2009 J. League Cup, and the 2009 Emperor's Cup.

Competitions

J. League

League table

Results summary

Results by round

J. League Cup

Group stage

Emperor's Cup

Players

First team squad

 

* Players in bold have senior international caps.

Out on loan

Starting XI 
Last updated on 3 February 2012.

Player statistics

References

External links
 J. League official site

Albirex Niigata
Albirex Niigata seasons